Danielle Pelham (born December 19, 1984) is an American taekwondo practitioner.

She won a gold medal in bantamweight at the 2009 World Taekwondo Championships in Copenhagen, by defeating Euda Carías in the semifinal, and Sarita Phongsri in the final.

References

External links

1984 births
Living people
American female taekwondo practitioners
World Taekwondo Championships medalists
21st-century American women